The Hårskolten Tunnel is a road tunnel that is part of Norwegian County Road 830 in the municipality of Fauske in Nordland county, Norway.  It is located between Finneid in the town of Fauske and the village of Sulitjelma.  This tunnel is the middle tunnel in a series of three tunnels on this road.  The Grønnlifjell Tunnel lies immediately to the east of this tunnel and the Sjønståfjell Tunnel lies immediately to the west of this tunnel.

The railway line was closed and dismantled in 1972. The tunnel was rebuilt soon after when the old railway line was converted into a highway which opened in 1975.

See also
Grønnlifjell Tunnel
Sjønståfjell Tunnel
Stokkviknakken Tunnel

References

Fauske
Road tunnels in Nordland
Railway tunnels in Nordland
1956 establishments in Norway
Tunnels completed in 1956
Tunnels on the Sulitjelma Line
Roads within the Arctic Circle